Solanum verrucosum is a species of wild potato in the family Solanaceae, native to Mexico. Its tubers are small and late to develop, but said to be quite tasty.

A diploid, it is being extensively studied for its resistance to Phytophthora infestans (the cause of late potato blight), and Potato leafroll virus, in an effort to improve the domestic potato Solanum tuberosum.

References

verrucosum
Endemic flora of Mexico
Flora of Northeastern Mexico
Flora of Central Mexico
Flora of Veracruz
Flora of Southwestern Mexico
Plants described in 1840
Taxa named by Diederich Franz Leonhard von Schlechtendal